Parliamentary elections were held in Czechoslovakia on 15 November 1925. The result was a victory for the Republican Party of Farmers and Peasants, which won 45 seats in the Chamber of Deputies and 23 seats in the Senate. Voter turnout was 90.1% in the Chamber election and 77.3% for the Senate.

Results

Chamber of Deputies

Senate

References

Czechoslovakia
1925 elections in Czechoslovakia
Legislative elections in Czechoslovakia
November 1925 events